Jérôme Fernandez (born 7 March 1977) is a retired French handball player. He was a captain of the France men's national handball team and currently holds the record for the number of goals for France's national team (1463 up to January 9, 2020).

Honours
 Olympic Games : 2000 (sixth), 2004 (fifth), 2008 (Gold)2012 (Gold)
 World Championship : 2001, 2009, 2011, 2015
 European Championship : 2006, 2010, 2014
 EHF Champions League : 2005
 EHF Cup : 2003
 European Supercup : 2004
 Spanish Supercup : 2004
 Copa del Rey : 2004
 French Championship : 2000, 2002
 Spanish Championship : 2003
 French Cup : 1998, 2000, 2001, 2002
 DHB-Pokal : 2011
 German Supercup : 2011
 IHF Super Globe : 2011

See also
List of handballers with 1000 or more international goals

References

French male handball players
French expatriate sportspeople in Germany
French expatriate sportspeople in Spain
FC Barcelona Handbol players
Liga ASOBAL players
1977 births
Living people
Handball players at the 2000 Summer Olympics
Handball players at the 2004 Summer Olympics
Handball players at the 2008 Summer Olympics
Handball players at the 2012 Summer Olympics
Olympic handball players of France
Olympic gold medalists for France
BM Ciudad Real players
Olympic medalists in handball
Medalists at the 2012 Summer Olympics
Medalists at the 2008 Summer Olympics
Officers of the Ordre national du Mérite
European champions for France